The Boston University Track and Tennis Center houses a banked, 6 lane, 200m indoor track.  On January 28, 2013, Olympic Medalist Galen Rupp ran a facility record of 3.50.92 in the mile.  On February 9, 2018, Edward Cheserek improved that to 3:49.44, the #2 mark in history at the time. On March 3, 2019, Yomif Kejelcha of Ethiopia improved that to a new world indoor record of 3:47.01. Also during that same race, American Johnny Gregorek Jr. ran a 3:49.98, becoming the second American to break 3:50 in the mile, also marking the first time indoors that two people ran under 3:50 in the same race.

Information
The Track and Tennis Center (TTC) was constructed in 2002 to house an indoor track and tennis courts.  The first track meet at the TTC occurred on December 6, 2002.  The first tennis match followed two months later on February 9, 2003.  The TTC replaced the Commonwealth Armory, which served as home to the Boston University indoor track team from 1979 through 2002.

References

Buildings at Boston University
Boston University Terriers sports venues
College indoor track and field venues in the United States
Sports venues completed in 2002